The 2009 World Sprint Speed Skating Championships were held in Krylatskoje, Moscow, on 17 and 18 January 2009. They were the 38th World Championships.

Women championships

Sprint results 

NQ = Not qualified for the second 1000m (only the best 24 are qualified)DQ = disqualified

Source: ISU

Men championships

Sprint results 

NQ = Not qualified for the second 1000m (only the best 24 are qualified)DQ = disqualifiedNF = Not FinishedNS = Not started

Source: ISU

Rules 
All participating skaters are allowed to skate the two 500 meters and one 1000 meters; 24 skaters may take part on the second 1000 meters. These 24 skaters are determined by the samalog standings after the three skated distances, and comparing these lists as follows:

 Skaters among the top 24 on both lists are qualified.
 To make up a total of 24, skaters are then added in order of their best rank on either list.

References

2009 World Sprint
World Sprint Speed Skating Championships, 2009
World Sprint, 2009
Sports competitions in Moscow
2009 in Russian sport